Kareli (officially known as Kareli Scheme) is a residential neighborhood of Allahabad. Developed by Awas Vikas in 1979, it was one of the biggest planned neighborhoods in India. The neighborhood is sub divided into neighborhoods like GTB Nagar, Gaus Nagar, Allahabad, Shams Nagar, Allahabad and Rehmat Nagar Colony, Allahabad. Kareli is the second largest colony of India in terms of Area and is one of the most expensive residential localities of Allahabad. It is also known as Officer's colony by the localas as the large number of people who served as government servants like IAS, IPS, PCS, etc inhabited the place.

Details
The neighborhood was predominantly occupied by the members of the mercantile middle class of Meerapur and Attarsuiya, and white collar workers from several public sector undertakings and private companies established in the new industrial region of
Naini. It was later overwhelmed by a richer population after the oil boom and privatization. However it is not maintained well. The roads have so many mudholes.

The majority of the people are members of the salaried class rather than business owners.

References 

Neighbourhoods in Allahabad

Thank you Raza Haider Rizvi